Anton Raphael Mengs (12 March 1728 – 29 June 1779) was a German painter, active in Dresden, Rome, and Madrid, who while painting in the Rococo period of the mid-18th century became one of the precursors to Neoclassical painting, which replaced Rococo as the dominant painting style in Europe.

Early life

Mengs was born in 1728 at Ústí nad Labem (German: Aussig) in the Kingdom of Bohemia, the son of Ismael Mengs, a Danish-born painter who eventually established himself at Dresden, where the court of Saxonian-Polish electors and kings was. His older sister, Therese Maron, was also a painter, as was his younger sister, Julia.

His and Therese's births in Bohemia were mere coincidence. Their mother was not their father's wife; Ismael carried on a years-long affair with the family's housekeeper, Charlotte Bormann. In an effort to conceal the births of two illegitimate children, Ismael took Charlotte, under the pretext of "vacations", to the nearest bigger town abroad, Ústí nad Labem (90 km upstream of the Elbe River). At least in Anton's case, Ismael Mengs took his baby and Charlotte back to Dresden a few weeks after the birth. There they lived for the next 13 years. 

In 1741, Ismael moved his family from Dresden to Rome.

Adulthood and death
In 1749, Anton Raphael Mengs was appointed the first painter to Frederick Augustus, elector of Saxony, but this did not prevent him from continuing to spend much of his time in Rome. There he married Margarita Guazzi, who had sat for him as a model in 1748. He converted to Catholicism, and in 1754 he became director of the Vatican painting school. His fresco painting Parnassus at Villa Albani gained him a reputation as a master painter.

In 1749, Mengs accepted a commission from the Duke of Northumberland to make a copy, in oil on canvas, of Raphael's fresco The School of Athens for his London home. Executed in 1752–5, Mengs's painting is full-sized, but he adapted the composition to a rectangular format and added other figures. It is now in the collection of the Victoria and Albert Museum. 

Mengs died in Rome in June 1779 and was buried there in the Church of Santi Michele e Magno.

Career

On two occasions he accepted invitations from Charles III of Spain to go to Madrid. There he produced some of his best work, most notably the ceiling of the banqueting hall of the Royal Palace of Madrid, the subject of which was the Triumph of Trajan and the Temple of Glory. After the completion of this work in 1777, Mengs returned to Rome, where he died two years later, in poor circumstances, leaving twenty children, seven of whom were pensioned by the king of Spain. His portraits and self-portraits recall an attention to detail and insight often lost in his grander paintings.

His closeness to Johann Joachim Winckelmann has enhanced his historical importance. Mengs came to share Winckelmann's enthusiasm for classical antiquity, and worked to establish the dominance of Neoclassical painting over the then popular Rococo style. At the same time, however, the influence of the Roman Baroque remained strong in his work, particularly in his religious paintings. He would have fancied himself the first neoclassicist, while, in fact, he may be the last flicker of Baroque art. Rudolf Wittkower wrote: "In the last analysis, he is as much an end as a beginning". Goethe regretted that "so much learning should have been allied to a total want of initiative and poverty of invention, and embodied with a strained and artificial mannerism."

Mengs had a well-known rivalry with the contemporary Italian painter Pompeo Batoni. He was also a friend of Giacomo Casanova. Casanova provides accounts of his personality and contemporary reputation through anecdotes in his Histoire de ma vie. Among his pupils in Italy were Anton von Maron (Antonio Maron;  (Vienna, 1731- Naples, 1761). His pupils in Spain included Agustín Esteve.

Besides numerous paintings in Madrid, the Ascension and St Joseph at Dresden, Perseus and Andromeda at Saint Petersburg, and the ceiling of the Villa Albani are among his chief works. A Noli me tangere was commissioned as an altar-piece by All Souls College, Oxford, and is now held in the National Gallery, London. Another altar-piece was installed in Magdalen College, Oxford.

Theoretical writings
Mengs wrote about art in Spanish, Italian, and German. He reveals an eclectic theory of art that sees perfection as attainable through a well-balanced fusion of diverse excellences: Greek design combined with the expression of Raphael, the chiaroscuro of Correggio, and the colour of Titian.

Selected works 
 Ascension (Dresden, Court Church), 1751/1766
 St Joseph (Dresden, Court Church), 1751/1766
 The Glory of Saint Eusebius (ceiling fresco, Sant'Eusebio, Rome), 1757 (modello, oil on canvas, National Gallery of Canada Ottawa)
 Portrait of Ferdinand I (National Museum of Capodimonte, Naples, Italy), 1759
 Charles III (Museo del Prado, Madrid), 1761
 Infante Don Louis de Borbon (Cleveland Museum of Art, Cleveland, Ohio)

Gallery

See also
 Karl Woermann, Ismael und Raphael Mengs (Leipzig, 1893)

Notes

Sources
 
 
 Neil Jeffares, Dictionary of pastellists before 1800, online edition
 Paintings by Anton Raphael Mengs at WikiGallery.org

External links 

Europe in the age of enlightenment and revolution, a catalog from The Metropolitan Museum of Art Libraries (fully available online as PDF), which contains material on Mengs (see index)
 'Self-portrait' (1774) at the Walker Art Gallery, Liverpool
 'Portrait of Charles III' (1761) at the Museo del Prado
 
 Scholarly articles in English about Anton Raphael Mengs both in web and PDF @ the Spanish Old Masters Gallery

1728 births
1779 deaths
German people of Danish descent
German male painters
18th-century German painters
German neoclassical painters
Sibling artists
Artists from Ústí nad Labem
German Roman Catholics
Neoclassical painters
Converts to Roman Catholicism
Catholic painters